Houstonia ouachitana, the Ouachita bluet, is a species of plants in the coffee family. It is endemic to the Ouachita Mountains of Arkansas and Oklahoma. It is an herb up to 20 cm tall, with lanceloate basal leaves and narrowly linear cauline leaves.

References

External links
Photo of herbarium specimen at Missouri Botanical Garden, collected in Arkansas, isotype of Houstonia ouachitana 

ouachitana
Flora of Arkansas
Flora of Oklahoma
Endemic flora of the United States
Plants described in 1977
Flora without expected TNC conservation status